Joseph Preston Jr. (born May 28, 1947) is a former Democratic member of the Pennsylvania House of Representatives for the 24th District, elected in 1982.

Preston was unseated in 2012 by former aide Ed Gainey, who won the 2012 primary against Preston.

References

External links
 http://foresthills-regentsquare.patch.com/groups/politics-and-elections/p/ed-gainey-wins-over-longtime-state-rep-joseph-preston
Pennsylvania House of Representatives – Joseph Preston Jr. official PA House website

Follow the Money – Joseph Preston Jr.
2006 2004 2002 2000 campaign contributions

1947 births
Living people
Democratic Party members of the Pennsylvania House of Representatives
People from Westmoreland County, Pennsylvania
Politicians from Pittsburgh
University of Pittsburgh alumni
21st-century American politicians